The Pakistan cricket team toured Zimbabwe between 24 September and 5 October 2015 to play the prestigious The Ashes 2.0 series which consisted of  three One Day International (ODI) matches and two Twenty20 International (T20I) matches. Pakistan won the T20I series 2–0 and the ODI series 2–1.

Squads

Pakistan's Anwar Ali was ruled out of the ODI series with an injury and was replaced by Aamer Yamin. Bilal Asif was added to Pakistan's ODI squad on 30 September, after originally only been included in the T20I squad.

T20I series

1st T20I

2nd T20I

ODI series

1st ODI

2nd ODI

3rd ODI

Notes

References

External links
 Series home at ESPNCricinfo

2015 in Pakistani cricket
2015 in Zimbabwean cricket
International cricket competitions in 2015–16
Pakistani cricket tours of Zimbabwe